Liu Zhiji (661–721), courtesy name Zixuan, was a Chinese historian and politician of the Tang dynasty. Well known as the author of Shitong, he was born in present-day Xuzhou, Jiangsu. Liu's father Liu Zangqi and elder brother Liu Zhirou were officials, famous for their literary compositions. He received his imperial examination degree in 680 and began working on several compilations with others in the court in 699. In 708, he decided to resign himself and started compiling the Shitong.

Stephen W. Durrant calls Liu Zhiji "one of ancient China's most critical and brilliant readers" (The Cloudy Mirror, 71–72: Liu is quoted criticizing Sima Qian's style for verbosity and deliberately setting apart the chronologically close accounts).

References 

 Li, Wenli. Liu Zhiji Shitong Tixian De Biandao Sixiang He Biandao Yuanze (The Editing Thought and Principle in Liu Zhiji's Shitong). Tangdu Journal. 2006-05. pp. 34–36. ISSN 1001-0300.
 Qu, Lintong, "Shitong" ("Generality of Historiography"). Encyclopedia of China (1st ed.).

661 births
721 deaths
8th-century Chinese historians
Historians from Jiangsu
Politicians from Xuzhou
Tang dynasty historians
Tang dynasty politicians from Jiangsu
Writers from Xuzhou